Irulam

Demographics
 India census, Irulam had a population of 21111 with 10637 males and 10474 females.

Economy 

The main crops in the village are pepper, coffee, cardamom, paddy and ginger.

Transportation
Irulam village can be accessed from Sultan Bathery or Pulpally. The Periya ghat road connects Mananthavady to Kannur and Thalassery.  The Thamarassery mountain road connects Calicut with Kalpetta. The Kuttiady mountain road connects Vatakara with Kalpetta and Mananthavady. The Palchuram mountain road connects Kannur and Iritty with Mananthavady.  The road from Nilambur to Ooty is also connected to Wayanad through the village of Meppadi.

The nearest railway station is at Mysore and the nearest airports are Kozhikode International Airport-120 km, Bengaluru International Airport-290 km, and   Kannur International Airport, 58 km.

Image Gallery

References

Sultan Bathery area
Villages in Wayanad district